The 1978–79 season was the 64th season of the Isthmian League, an English football competition.

At the end of the season Alliance Premier League was created. As a result of it, Isthmian League teams lost possibility to take part in the elections to the Football League as only highest placed team from Alliance Premier League who met the Football League requirements may apply. The Isthmian League refused to participate in the formation of the new league.

Premier Division

The Premier Division consisted of 22 clubs, including 20 clubs from the previous season and two new clubs, promoted from Division One:
Dulwich Hamlet
Oxford City

This season was the last one when Isthmian League clubs may have applied for election to the Football League. Though, no clubs participated in the elections.

League table

Division One

Division One consisted of 22 clubs, including 18 clubs from the previous season and four new clubs:

Two clubs relegated from the Premier Division:
Bishop's Stortford
Southall & Ealing Borough

Two clubs promoted from Division Two:
Epsom & Ewell
Metropolitan Police

At the end of the season Leytonstone, relegated from the Premier Division, merged with Ilford to form Leytonstone & Ilford. Subsequently, St Albans City were given a reprieve.

League table

Division Two

Division Two consisted of 18 clubs, including 15 clubs from the previous season and three new clubs:
Corinthian-Casuals, relegated from Division One
Hornchurch, relegated from Division One
Hungerford Town, joined from the Hellenic Football League

League table

References

Isthmian League seasons
I